Prignano sulla Secchia (locally ) is a comune (municipality) in the Province of Modena in the Italian region Emilia-Romagna, located about  west of Bologna and about  southwest of Modena.  It is in the Modenese Apennines, in the valley of the Secchia river.

Prignano sulla Secchia borders the following municipalities: Baiso, Castellarano, Palagano, Polinago, Sassuolo, Serramazzoni, Toano.

Notable people
 
 
Giuseppe Castagnetti (1909–1965), Roman Catholic politician

References

External links
 Official website

Cities and towns in Emilia-Romagna